Krzeszowskie Wzgórza –  part of the micro-region of Kotlina Krzeszowska located within the Kotlina Kamiennogórska in Central Sudetes. From the north-east borders with Czary Las and Pasmo Lesistej in Stone Mountains.

Peaks

Passes

Localities 
The following settlements are located in this region: Grzędy, Grzędy Górne, Krzeszów, Krzeszówek, Kochanów.

Bibliography 
 Słownik geografii turystycznej Sudetów, tom 8 Kotlina Kamiennogórska, Wzgórza Bramy Lubawskiej, Zawory, red. Marek Staffa, Wydawnictwo I-BiS, Wrocław 1997, s. 171 i 172
 Sudety Środkowe. Skala 1:40000. Jelenia Góra: Wydawnictwo Turystyczne Plan, 2005. 

 
Sudetes